Turrialba Volcano is an active volcano in central Costa Rica that has been explosively eruptive in recent years including 2016  and in January, March and April 2017. Visitors used to be able to hike down into the main crater, but increased volcanic activity in 2014–17, resulting in large clouds of volcanic ash, caused the surrounding Turrialba Volcano National Park to close. However, with the subsiding of the eruptions, the park and volcano reopened on December 4, 2020.

Turrialba is adjacent to Irazú and both are among Costa Rica's largest volcanoes. Turrialba has had at least five large explosive eruptions in last 3500 years. The volcano is monitored by the Deep Earth Carbon Degassing Project.

On clear days both the Pacific Ocean and Caribbean Sea can be seen from the summit. Below the summit is a mountain range and montane forest, with ferns, bromeliads, lichens and mosses. Most of the forest is either primary or secondary forest.

The volcano is named after its canton, Turrialba, in Costa Rica's Cartago Province.  There is no clear consensus on the origin of the name Turrialba, but historians disagree with attempts to attribute the name to the patronym Torrealba (from Aragon in Spain) or from the Latin Turris alba (white tower). The general consensus is that Turrialba derives from the local Indian (Huetar language), but there is no agreement on its actual roots.

Activity
 During the 19th century, the volcano erupted and emitted ash several times (1847, 1853, 1855, 1859, 1866), producing pyroclastic flows. The last major eruption was in 1866.
 Small signs of activity started in 1996.
 In January 2001, the volcano reported increased activity, displaying strong fumarole activity at the central craters. The volcanic activities have increased since 2005. 
 On March 31, 2017, the volcano started to show some activity with ash eruptions.
 The National Park area opened for visitors was closed from 2009 to 2011.

Two villages, La Central and El Retiro, were evacuated.
 On January, 2012 a new opening on the west of the crater was created after a phreatic eruption. 
 On April 12, 2012, a small eruption occurred.
 On May 21, 2013, at 08:52, a gas explosion widened several openings near the main crater that appeared in 2010 and 2012.
 In July 2013 researchers found that tremors around the area increased from about twenty earthquakes a day, to up to thirty per hour.
 On October 17, 2014, the quantity of tremors increased from around 50-100 a day, to 200 a day.
 On October 29, 2014, at around 10:10, a tremor started and kept constant, until a phreatic eruption occurred around 23:10 at the west opening that appeared in January 2012. Many citizens reported ash falling on their properties and a strong odor of sulphur in the cantons of Vázquez de Coronado, Goicoechea, Moravia, Desamparados, Aserrí, Escazú, Santa Ana, Montes de Oca, Tibás, Alajuelita, Puriscal, San José in the province of San José, La Union in the province of Cartago and Santo Domingo and Heredia, in the province of Heredia.

March 2015 

 On March 12, 2015, eruptions at around 11:00 and 14:12 sent ashes through all the Central Valley, it is regarded as the most significant activity since 1996. The Juan Suantamaría and Tobías Bolaños international airports were closed due to visibility being less than 100 meters.
 On March 13, 2015, an eruption occurred at 21:07.

May 2015 

 On May 4, 2015, an eruption occurred at 15:24.

May 2016
An eruption occurred on May 21, 2016. It was characterized by one resident as the largest since 2010. Ash fell as far away as the capital, San Jose, and at least 500 people went to hospitals complaining of breathing problems. Flights into San Jose were cancelled due to concerns about ash.

September 2016
On September 19, at 02:54 an eruption lasting around fifteen minutes was the first event of many through the day that eventually covered the metropolitan area with ash.  There were events at 11:30, 14:40, 15:34.

The events continued through September 20 with an eruption at 06:20.

Airports in the metropolitan area were closed.

See also
 List of volcanoes in Costa Rica

References

External links 

 Costa Rican Vulcanologic and Seismologic Observatory: Turrialba
Webcam of the Vulcanological and Seismological Observatory of National University of Costa Rica.

Stratovolcanoes of Costa Rica
Active volcanoes
Mountains of Costa Rica
Geography of Cartago Province